Hingbagee Mahao (English: The Taste of Living) is a 2015 Indian Meitei language film directed by Jeetendra Ningomba and produced by Kachi Shanti. The story and screenplay of the film was written by Jeetendra Ningomba. Hingbagee Mahao was released at Bhagyachandra Open Air Theatre (BOAT), Imphal, on 29 April 2015. It won many awards, including the Best Feature Film Award at 5th SSS MANIFA 2016.

Synopsis
The film tells the story of
Mangoljao's family who dwell in the floating phumdis of the Loktak lake. After Mangoljao's death, Ningol and her three sons shift to Imphal in search of a livelihood, since their only house is declared by the government as being illegally occupied. The eldest of the three, Achouba, sacrifices his youth and all the worldly pleasures so that he can earn enough for the sustenance of the family. But the younger brothers, Yaima and Atomba loosen themselves from Ningol and Achouba after they get married. When they come to know from Linthoi about their eldest brother's hardships, sufferings and sacrifices and the resultant ailment borne by Achouba, they come back begging for forgiveness. They finally understand the real taste of living.

Cast
 Sagolsem Dhanamanjuri as Ningol
 SP Ingocha Yanglem as Mangoljao
 Hamom Sadananda as Achouba
 Vidyananda Laishram as Yaima
 Roshan Pheiroijam as Atomba
 Abenao Elangbam as Linthoi
 Soma Laishram as Mary
 Reshmi Sorokhaibam as Leina
 Narendra Ningomba as Mary's Father
 Gurumayum Ananta as Doctor

Accolades
Hingbagee Mahao won many awards and nominations, including the Best Feature Film Award at the 5th SSS MANIFA 2016 held by Sahitya Seva Samiti, Kakching and Film Forum Manipur.

Soundtrack
Rabei Keishamcha composed the soundtrack for the film and Jeetendra Ningomba wrote the lyrics. The songs are titled Sajik Thabagum Nganduna and Uragasu Wahalli.

References

2010s Meitei-language films
2015 films